Veronica derwentiana, commonly known as Derwent speedwell, is a flowering plant species of the family Plantaginaceae, endemic to south-eastern Australia. It is a perennial with toothed leaves and white or pale blue flowers in terminal sprays in spring and summer.

Description
The stems are smooth or have small hairs lying longitudinal, occasionally on the whole surface and not branched below the flowers. The stems remain for up to 2 years. The leaves vary at the base and may be wedge, squared, or heart shaped on a small broad stalk or without a stalk. The leaf margin has 30-80 small pointed teeth. Flowering occurs in summer.

Taxonomy and naming
Veronica derwentiana was first formally described by Henry Cranke Andrews in 1808  and the description was published in The Botanist's Repository for New and Rare Plants. The species was named after the type form where it was found near the Derwent River Tasmania.

There are five subspecies described and accepted by the Australian Plant Census:

V. derwentiana Andrews subsp. derwentiana;
V. derwentiana subsp. homalodonta  (B.G.Briggs & Ehrend.) B.G.Briggs;   
V. derwentiana subsp. maideniana (Gand.) B.G.Briggs;
V. derwentiana subsp. subglauca (B.G.Briggs & Ehrend.) B.G.Briggs;
V. derwentiana subsp. anisodonta (B.G.Briggs & Ehrend.) B.G.Briggs.

Distribution and habitat
Derwent speedwell occurs in a variety of habitats including eucalypt forest and alpine herb fields in Queensland, New South Wales, Victoria, Tasmania and South Australia. It is often seen on disturbed sites.

References

Flora of New South Wales
Flora of Queensland
Flora of South Australia
Flora of Tasmania
Flora of Victoria (Australia)
derwentiana
Taxa named by Henry Cranke Andrews